George Bastl and Chris Guccione were the defending champions. Guccione chose not compete this year and Bastl chose to compete in Sanremo instead.
Jonathan Erlich and Andy Ram won in the final 6–4, 6–3 against Alexander Peya and Simon Stadler.

Seeds

Draw

Draw

References
 Main Draw

Israel Open - Doubles
2010 in Israeli sport
Israel Open